Yard Dogs Road Show is a thirteen-member traveling cabaret that features a blend of performances, including vaudeville, burlesque, stage magic, sideshow oddities, and beatnik "hobo poetry." Performances include musical interludes, song and dance numbers, and background music from the Yard Dogs cartoon heavy band. Originally from San Francisco, the Yard Dogs made their first full-fledged national tour in the Spring of 2005, playing 25 shows in 35 days with seven sold-out performances. 

For use in this Wiki entry, the band's manager allowed the use of the song "Blockhead" as an example of their style

History 
The Yard Dogs began in 1998 as a three-piece traveling jug band formed by Yard Dogs founder Eddy Joe Cotton. The jug band started out playing in the road houses and dance halls of the west coast. During this time, band members took part in modern-day acid tests with the likes of Ken Kesey and the Merry Pranksters. For the next year, the band toured up and down the West Coast in a 1967 Ford Galaxy 500. It was on a cold night in 1999 that the band stopped to roll out their sleeping bags off Interstate 5 at a place called Dog Creek Road that the band found its new name and new calling. Thus the Yard Dogs Road Show was born.

One by one, the band attracted its colorful cast of performers. The band now sports such members as Tobias the Mystic Man (sword-swallower and magician), Guitar Boy (a spandex-sporting "guitar hero"), Hellvis (a musclebound fire-eater), and the Black and Blue Burlesque dancing girls. Founder Eddy Joe Cotton has also performed with They Might Be Giants and has been featured on NPR, West Coast Live, and To the Best of Our Knowledge. He is also the author of Hobo – A Young Man’s Thoughts On Trains And Tramping In America, which made it to the Denver Post best-seller list.

The Yard Dogs Road Show has performed at venues such as the Knitting Factory in Hollywood and NYC, the Wakarusa Festival in Lawrence, Kansas, the Bluebird Theater in Denver, Colorado and the Orpheum Theater in Flagstaff, Arizona. They have collaborated with Teatro ZinZanni, Red Bull, Lucas Films, and New Belgium Brewery, and they participate in annual Native American cultural exchange festivals with the Quechan and Mohave tribes. Members have also collaborated with The Hall and Christ World of Wonders.

Members 

Eddy Joe Cotton – Straw Boss & Founder
 Lily Rose Love – Singer & Trombone
 EEnor Wild Boar – Lead Guitar & Singer
Micah D-Liscious – Bass Guitar & Showman
Sidecar Tommy – Drums
Kid Casbah -Trumpet & Special Effects
Sansa Alexander Asylum III – Accordion & Singer
Tobias the Mystic Man – Contraptions & Mysticism
Broadway Freddie – Song & Dance Man
Zoe Jakes – Burlesque & Belly Dancer
Teri Lynn Sage – Burlesque Dancer
Shenandoah Sassafras – Burlesque Dancer & Singer
Richy– Sound Engineer
Honorary Members
 Leighton
Bell Pod Jablinsky – Choreographer
Gypsy Jablinsky

Discography 
The Fabulous Yard Dogs Road Show CD (2006)
Jug Jam
Driving Down the Road
St. James
Death March
Norton P. Electric
King of the Hobos
Red Light
Ricardo Del Fuego De Manga
Thou Art Hypnotized
Blockhead
Spectactometer
Guitar Boy
Tobias the Mystery Man
New Day
Turkey Neck Shuffle #23

References 

Cabaret
Vaudeville
American neo-burlesque performers